Lathyrus nissolia, the grass vetchling or grass pea, is a species of flowering plant in the pea and bean family Fabaceae. It is native to most of Europe, Maghreb, Levant and the Caucasus. Despite its common names, it is not a grass, but belongs to the legume family Fabaceae.

Description
Grass vetchling is an annual plant, with an erect stem branching from the base, and growing to a height of about 2 feet (0.7 m). It is entirely without true leaves, leaflets or tendrils. The leaf stalk, however, is flattened out until it closely resembles a blade of grass ending in a fine point, and the stipules at its base greatly help the deception.

The crimson flowers come out in June and July, and are rather small, solitary and borne on a very long footstalk. They have the ability to self-pollinate.

The flowers are succeeded by long, slender, straight pods, which are at first very flat, but become cylindrical when the contained peas are fully developed.

Habitat
Grassland, banks and field margins on neutral to acid soil.

Distribution
The species is rare in Scotland and very localised in England and Wales, though there are signs that it is currently spreading in the United Kingdom. Not recorded from Ireland.

References

nissolia
Flora of Lebanon
Flora of Europe
Flora of Serbia
Plants described in 1753
Taxa named by Carl Linnaeus